Lyubov Pavlovna Aksyonova,  (born March 15, 1990) is a Russian actress.

Biography 
Aksyonova was born in Moscow. She studied at Russian Institute of Theatre Arts. In 2012 she made her film debut.

Acting career 
She made her debut as an actress in 2009, starring in several episodes of the series Detectives and Trace. 

In 2011, she starred in the television series Univer. New Dorm. In the same 2011, after filming the television series Closed School, where she played one of the key roles, the actress became recognizable and in demand.
In 2012 she played one of the main roles in the feature film Short Stories, which opened her way to big cinema. 

In 2017, the actress played in the film Salyut 7. In 2018-2019. Among her works are roles in the films Beyond the Edge (2018 film), The Perfect Ones (2018 film), and Coma (2020 film).

Selected filmography

References

External links 
 Lyubov Aksyonova on kino-teatr.ru

1990 births
Living people
Actresses from Moscow
Russian film actresses
Russian television actresses
21st-century Russian actresses
Russian Academy of Theatre Arts alumni
Russian activists against the 2022 Russian invasion of Ukraine